The Bombardment of Almería was a naval action which took place on 31 May 1937, during the Spanish Civil War.

Background
In April 1937, the Non-intervention Committee established naval patrols in order to patrol the Spanish coasts and harbors. The naval patrols were furnished by Great Britain, France, Germany and Italy. The Spanish Republican Air Force carried out attacks against the harbor of Mallorca, a known-Nationalist naval base. The commander of the German naval patrol protested, nevertheless Mallorca was a patrol zone assigned to France and the foreign ships were inside Spanish territorial waters. The same day, two Republican bombers piloted by Russian pilots, attacked the German heavy cruizer  at Ibiza, killing 20–23 German sailors and wounding 73. Hitler wanted to declare war on the Republic, but instead ordered the city of Almeria to be shelled.

Bombing of Almeria
At dawn on 31 May 1937, the German heavy cruiser  and four German destroyers attacked the city of Almeria. The German ships fired 200 shells at the town, killing 19-20 civilians, wounding 50 and destroying 35 buildings. Indalecio Prieto, the Republican minister of Defense wanted to attack the German fleet, but the president Manuel Azaña and the prime minister Juan Negrin were opposed to Prieto's plan because an open war against Germany might have brought the annihilation of the Republic. Negrin and Azaña sent protest notes to the secretary-general of the League of Nations and to the French and the British governments. However, the British and the French governments said that the German attack had been justified.

Aftermath
On 15 June, Germany denounced a supposed Spanish Republican Navy attack against the German cruiser , and on 23 June Germany and Italy withdrew from the Non-Intervention Committee and Portugal withdrew the British observers on its frontier. At the end of July the Italians started a campaign of maritime attacks against Republican and neutral merchant ships. The loss of merchant ships and the beginning of the Sino-Japanese war led the Soviets to reduce their aid to the Republic. By mid 1937 the Republic was virtually isolated.

References

Bibliography
 
 

Explosions in 1937
Mass murder in 1937
Naval battles of the Spanish Civil War
Naval battles involving Germany
1937 in Spain
Conflicts in 1937
Maritime incidents in 1937
Spanish Civil War massacres
History of Andalusia
Almería
Mediterranean naval operations of the Spanish Civil War
May 1937 events